Wu Youjia (born 6 May 1983) is a Chinese athlete specialising in the high hurdles. He competed at the 2005 World Championships without reaching the semifinals.

He has a personal best of 13.55 in the 110 metres hurdles (2005) and 7.68 in the indoor 60 metres hurdles (2007).

Competition record

References

1983 births
Living people
Chinese male hurdlers